Chandamukha Siva (a.k.a. Sandamuhunu) was King of Anuradhapura in the 1st century, whose reign lasted from 44 to 52. He succeeded his father Ilanaga as King of Anuradhapura.

During his period he built a tank near to the village called Manikaragama and gave it to a temple called Issaramanna and his consort Damilidevi was allotted her own revenue from that village to give this temple. 

Chandamukha was assassinated by his brother Yasalalaka Tissa at a water festival at Tissa Lake, who succeeded him afterwards.

See also
 List of Sri Lankan monarchs
 History of Sri Lanka

References

External links
 Kings & Rulers of Sri Lanka
 Codrington's Short History of Ceylon

Monarchs of Anuradhapura
C
 Sinhalese Buddhist monarchs
C
C